Transitional kindergarten (abbreviated TK) is a California school grade that serves as a bridge between preschool and kindergarten, to provide students with time to develop fundamental skills needed for success in school in a setting that is appropriate to the student's age and development. It is not called preschool because it generally comes after preschool and before kindergarten.

Transitional kindergarten is also available in some schools in other states and can serve as a stepping-stone between preschool and kindergarten, especially for children with birthdates close to their state's kindergarten cutoff date.

Implementation

The grade was created by the Kindergarten Readiness Act (SB 1381), which was authored by Senator Joseph Simitian and Senate President pro Tem Darrell Steinberg, and signed into law in 2010 by Gov. Schwarzenegger. The act also changed California's relatively late kindergarten entry date from December 2 to September 1, so that around 95% of children will have reached five years of age on the first day of kindergarten (any time in mid/late August), and those few that haven't yet would complete the fifth year at least soon after the first day. A child is automatically eligible for transitional kindergarten if the child will turn five between September 2 and December 2. Parents of children who turn five on December 3 or later may petition the school district to have their child admitted into transitional kindergarten, because they will still start regular kindergarten with the same batch of children who attend regular preschool instead (December 3 - September 1) It is important to have the children ready for kindergarten. The transitional period will help them learn all of the school readiness skill they will need to thrive in school. Those skills include areas in their health and physical skills, social and emotional development, languages skills, approaches to learning and their general knowledge according to research from First Things First resource. However, by law, parents may not petition the school district to have their child admitted to regular kindergarten if the child is born on September 2 or later.

Transitional kindergarten is a part of the public school system and is free for families. Classes are taught by credentialed teachers from the K–12 system. Existing funding for these children with fall birthdays that would have been eligible for kindergarten under the old kindergarten entry dates is redirected to transitional kindergarten and used to employ existing teachers and classroom facilities.

The law phases in the new age requirement by moving the cutoff date one month a year for three years, beginning in the fall of 2012. In the fall of 2014, at full implementation, approximately 125,000 children – including more than 52,000 English language learners and about 79,000 who attend Title I schools – will benefit from transitional kindergarten.

AIR, the American Institutes for Research, recently released a report on the first year of statewide TK, which finds that 89% of districts reported they offered transitional kindergarten, representing 96% of the state's kindergarten population. An estimated 39,000 four-year-olds were served in the first year of implementation.

See also
 Pre-kindergarten

References

External links
TKCalifornia.org, a project by Early Edge California providing support and tips for teaching and administering high-quality TK
Transitional Kindergarten FAQs from California Department of Education
TK resource sheet on webinars and TKCalifornia.org
Early Edge California's Kindergarten Readiness Page
Quotes about TK from parents, business leaders, community leaders, teachers and more

Early childhood education
Kindergarten